The S1 is a line on the Berlin S-Bahn. It operates over:
the Prussian Northern Railway, opened on 10 July 1877 and electrified in 1925,
a short section of the Berlin-Szczecin railway, opened on 1 August 1842 and electrified in 1924, 
the Nord-Süd-Tunnel, opened on 28 May 1936 from Humboldthain to Unter den Linden and on 9 October 1939 to Anhalter Bahnhof and the junction with the Wannsee Railway and 
the Wannsee Railway, opened on 1 June 1874 from Zehlendorf to Wannsee and on 1 October 1891 from Potsdamer Bahnhof to Zehlendorf (next to the Potsdam trunk line, opened on 29 October 1838) and electrified on 15 May 1933.

Gallery

References

Berlin S-Bahn lines

fi:S1 (Berliinin S-Bahn)